Maram is a Sino-Tibetan language spoken in India. It is taught up to secondary school, and the younger generations are almost fully literate.

Locations
Ethnologue reports that Maram is spoken in the following locations.

Senapati district, northern Manipur: 5 villages near Senapati, and 26 villages near Maram
Imphal district, Manipur
Assam

Dialects
Ethnologue lists the following dialects of Maram:
Willong Circle
Maram Khullen Circle
T. Khullen
Ngatan

References

Languages of Assam
Languages of Manipur
Zeme languages
Endangered languages of India